Grace May Tyson (February 6, 1881 - October 20, 1941) was a child singer, vaudeville performer, and actress who lived in Kalamazoo, Michigan when she was not touring. She partnered with Arthur McWatters, and by 1898, they were performing under the act "McWatters & Tyson".

She was born in Saginaw, Michigan or Scotts, Michigan on February 6, 1881, to parents Helen and George W. Tyson. She had five siblings, including two sisters that both later became performers: Pearl and Lena Tyson. Grace occasionally performed with them later in life. She went to school at Lovell Street School, No. 3 in Kalamazoo and began performing at a young age. By age 11, she performed with the local Getter’s Mastodon Minstrels, traveling throughout the western part of Michigan. By age 12, she performed with Frank Tucker's repertory company.

While touring with the Columbian Stock Company, she met actor Arthur McWatters when they were paired together for stage performances. During their routines together, they began to feature McWatters' music compositions. Tyson also began acting in theater productions as a soubrette. In 1898, Tyson and McWatters created the McWatters-Tyson Company, and started to perform together in their own acts.

A photograph of her performing appeared on the cover of the songsheet for "A Modern Century Girl".

Filmography
Mlle. Irene the Great

References

Comedians from Michigan

1881 births
1941 deaths